Maciej Tarnogrodzki (born 28 August 1975) is a football coach and former football player from Poland. He is currently head coach of UCD in the League of Ireland.
He coached the first team of Bray Wanderers in the League of Ireland and was then appointed Manager of the club's Under-19 team.                                               

In April 2015, he was appointed as interim manager (head coach) of the Bray senior team after the resignation of Alan Mathews.
Maciej completed Pro Licence coaching qualifications in 2018.

Earlier he had been coach for under-age teams and later the Reserve team in Shelbourne.

On 21 August 2019, Tarnogrodzki was appointed as manager of League of Ireland Premier Division club UCD, stepping up from the role of Under 19's manager, which he had for the previous 3 years.

References 

1975 births
Living people
People from Gniezno
Polish footballers
Polish football managers
Sportspeople from Greater Poland Voivodeship
Bray Wanderers F.C. managers
League of Ireland managers

Association footballers not categorized by position
Polish expatriate footballers